Salix myricoides, the bayberry willow or blue-leaf willow, is a species of flowering plant in the family Salicaceae, native to the Great Lakes region of the Midwestern United States, and to eastern Canada. It is typically found on beaches and dunes of the Lakes, and occasionally along inland streams and in fens, if calcareous. For example, in Maine it is found only on the ice-scoured shore of the St. John River.

References

myricoides
Flora of Eastern Canada
Flora of Wisconsin
Flora of Illinois
Flora of Michigan
Flora of Indiana
Flora of Ohio
Flora of Pennsylvania
Flora of Maine
Plants described in 1803